Sumter is an unincorporated community in Valley County, Nebraska, in the United States.

History
A post office was established at Sumter in 1894, and was discontinued the following year.

References

Unincorporated communities in Valley County, Nebraska
Unincorporated communities in Nebraska